The International Federation of Medical Students' Associations (IFMSA) is a non-governmental organization representing associations of medical students. It was founded in May 1951 and currently maintains 139 member organizations from 130 countries around.

History 
The International Federation of Medical Students' Associations was one of the numerous international student organizations set up directly after the end of the Second World War. The first meeting that saw the establishment of the Federation was held in Copenhagen, Denmark in May 1951. The first members of this new organization were England, Austria, the Federal Republic of Germany, Finland, Norway, Sweden, the Netherlands, Switzerland, and Denmark. London saw the first General Assembly of IFMSA in July 1952. The meeting had a total of thirty participants from ten countries.

Starting from the exclusively European founding organizations the Federation has expanded to include 136 members from all over the world.

IFMSA has always focused on student mobility and exchange as well as conference and workshop organization. The first conferences were the Student International Clinical Conferences, which were quite successful in the 1950s. Various summer schools have been organized through the years, starting in 1963 in Denmark, the UK, and Scandinavia. Other conferences have discussed medical education, drugs and AIDS, and HIV issues. In the 1960s projects were organized to help less advantaged students in developing countries the Book Aid project, which sought to send medical books from wealthier nations and the Equipment Appeal, which promoted the shipping of surplus medical equipment to these countries.

The 1970s medical students saw a need for the decentralization of IFMSA. To this aim, IFMSA contributed to the creation of regional medical student organizations in Africa and Asia. Subsequently, regional vice-presidents were elected for six regions as a way of promoting regionalization but this structure was abandoned after a few years.

In the early 1980s IFMSA issued a number of resolutions and declarations on topics ranging from Medical Education to the Prevention of Nuclear War to Primary Health Care. In the late 1980's there was a push towards organizing projects that would be able to make a change locally and thus the Village Concept Project idea was born after collaboration with other international student organizations. 1986 also saw the start of the Leadership Training Programs in collaboration with World Health Organization. These training programs are still active today.

Official relations with WHO started back in 1969, when the collaboration resulted in the organization of a symposium on "Programmed Learning in Medical Education", as well as immunology and tropical medicine programs. In the following years, IFMSA and WHO collaborated in the organization of a number of workshops and training programs. IFMSA has been collaborating with UNESCO since 1971. Since 2007 IFMSA has been an official supporting organization of HIFA2015 (Healthcare Information For All by 2015).

Activities 
The main activities of IFMSA are student exchanges and different projects. Around 14,000 medical students each year participate in international medical student exchanges, both professional and academic (research). IFMSA organizes projects, programs, seminars and workshops on areas of public health, medical education, reproductive health and human rights and peace.

Organization 
All activities of the IFMSA are linked to one of its six standing committees, which are:
 Standing Committee on Medical Education (SCOME)
 Standing Committee on Professional Exchange (SCOPE)
 Standing Committee on Research Exchange (SCORE)
 Standing Committee on Public Health (SCOPH)
 Standing Committee on Sexual & Reproductive Health and Rights including HIV & AIDS (SCORA)
 Standing Committee on Human Rights and Peace (SCORP)

Structure 
To be able to work together, IFMSA has created an organizational structure, which facilitates the flow of ideas and enables the development of activities.

IFMSA is composed of medical students' associations from 126 different countries, from which are formed 136 members of IFMSA and are called National Member Organizations (NMOs). All the activities of IFMSA are organized by the NMOs. Each NMO has its own identity. Most NMOs have Local Committees at the medical schools in their country. The Local Committees coordinate and organize IFMSA activities. Through these Local Committees the NMOs are in direct contact with the medical students.

IFMSA is a federation, which respects the autonomy of its members, the NMOs. The NMOs can decide which activities they take part in and what new activities should be developed.

IFMSA functions as an umbrella organization with 140 national and local organizations in 129 countries.

The decision making process is in the hands of the General Assembly, the executive process is in the hands of the International Board and the controlling power is in the hands of the Supervising Council.

The General Assembly (GA) is composed of representatives of all NMO's, and meets twice a year in March and August. The General Assembly decides the activities of IFMSA, the regulations, and the management and elects the Team of Officials and the Supervising Council.

The General Assembly elects the Team of Officials (TO) each year. It is composed of the Executive Board (EB), Standing Committee Directors, Liaison Officers, and Regional Directors. The Executive Board is responsible for the daily management of the Federation and deals with issues such as fundraising, marketing, external relations, finances, administration, development and support to National Member Organizations.

Standing Committee Directors are assigned to one field of activities. They coordinate the Standing Committee, which carries out these activities. They give support to national and local officers, prepare the meetings of the Standing Committee and are responsible for development of new activities.

Liaison Officers maintain the contacts with important external relations and represent IFMSA towards those organizations. The Regional Directors are responsible of each of the IFMSA 5 Regions.

The Supervising Council is elected by the General Assembly to evaluate and supervise the work of the IFMSA officials and undertakes actions in case problems arise.

Presidents 
 1995–1996 – Ahmed Fayed, Egypt – EMR
 2001-2002 – Joel Kammeyer, United States – EMR
 2002-2003 - Kristina Oegaard Norway - Europe
 2003-2004 - Emily Spry, United Kingdom - Europe
 2005–2006 – Jana Kammeyer, Slovakia – Europe
 2006–2007 – Ahmed Ali, Sudan – Africa
 2007–2008 – Anas Eid, Palestine – EMR
 2008–2009 – Melhim Bou Alwan, Lebanon – EMR
 2009–2010 – Silva Rukavina, Croatia – Europe
 2010–2011 – Chijioke Kaduru, Ghana – Africa
 2011–2012 – Christopher Pleyer, Austria – Europe
 2012–2013 – Roopa Dhatt, United States – Americas
 2013–2014 – Josko Mise, Croatia – Europe
 2014–2015 – Agostinho Sousa, Portugal – Europe
 2015–2016 – Karim M. Abuzeid, Egypt – EMR
 2016–2017 – Cherkaoui Omar, Morocco – EMR
 2017–2018 – Carlos Acosta, Brazil – Americas
 2018–2019 – Batool Al-Wahdani, Jordan – EMR
 2019–2020 – Nebojša Nikolić, Serbia – Europe
 2020–2021 – Po-Chin Li Taiwan – Asia
 2021–2022 – Mohamed El Amine Youcef Ali Algeria – EMR
 2022–2023 – Mariona Borrell Arrasa – Catalonia, Spain – Europe

Meetings

General Assemblies
Twice a year, the delegations of the NMO's of IFMSA get together at the IFMSA General Assemblies. The March Meeting and the August Meeting bring together several hundred (600–900) medical students from all around the world. During the seven days of the meetings, the delegates discuss matters of the Federation and make valuable contacts for their organizations.

The General Assembly remains the highest decision making body of the Federation although the actual program of the meeting has developed into a mixture of training, planning and evaluation sessions in between the legislative Plenary Sessions. The work in the Standing Committees of IFMSA is the essence for most delegates: signing contracts, presenting and planning projects are all in a day's work for the National Officers from the participating organizations. An extensive Training and Resource Development component has been integrated in the program, providing the participants with new skills needed in their work, but seldom found in the regular University curriculum: Lobbying Skills, Group Dynamics and Strategic Planning to name a few.

With IFMSA being much more than just exchanges, the Project Fair has evolved to extend presentations of local, national and international projects outside the Standing Committees. Round Table Discussions enable the student delegates to discuss currently relevant topics with invited experts and short lectures are frequently given by representatives from, for example, different UN agencies.

A special Financial Committee is elected at each General Assembly to audit the budget and finances of the Federation. Other legislative proceedings at the meetings include adoption of reports from the Executive Board members, IFMSA Officials and IFMSA projects, and adoption of official IFMSA Policy Statements. Guidelines on which areas IFMSA should focus on and other important decisions for the future of the Federation are prepared by the Presidents of the National Member Organizations together with the Executive Board and brought for approval to the Plenary Sessions.

Hosting a General Assembly is an honor, but also a great trial for the Organizing Committee. The entire process is run by student volunteers, from the fundraising to the implementation, and shows that the power of IFMSA indeed lies at the local level. As with any international meeting, the social program is important in providing relaxation between the long hours of work, and giving the hosts an opportunity to show their culture and creativity to their foreign friends.

Regional and sub-regional meetings
In addition to the General Assemblies, the National Member Organizations are also getting together for Regional Meetings. These meetings follow a similar agenda as General Assemblies, and are organized yearly for each region. They allow more students of the Region to gather, because the meeting is always in the Region, and the agenda is focused on regionally relevant topics.

Awards 
The IFMSA won on 3 October 2014 the Health Systems Award - Civil Organization. This award recognizes the organization that best employs social media to engage civil society in health systems-related dialogue. It recognizes the work the Federation has been doing to connect and engage with health communities around the world.

See also 
 American Medical Student Association (AMSA-USA)
 Australian Medical Students' Association (AMSA-AUS)
 International Association of Dental Students (IADS)
 International Pharmaceutical Students' Federation (IPSF)
 Iranian Medical Students Association (IMSA-IRAN)

References

External links
 

 

Med
Medical and health student organizations
Student organizations established in 1951
1951 establishments in Denmark